The Shire of Mitchell is a local government area in the Hume region of Victoria, Australia, located North of Melbourne. It includes the towns of Broadford, Kilmore, Seymour, Tallarook, Pyalong and Wallan. It was formed in 1994 from the amalgamation of the Shire of Pyalong, the Shire of Kilmore, most of the Shire of Broadford, and parts of the Shire of McIvor and Rural City of Seymour.

The Shire is governed and administered by the Mitchell Shire Council; its seat of local government and administrative centre is located at the council headquarters in Broadford, it also has service centres located in Kilmore, Seymour and Wallan. The Shire is named after an early British surveyor and explorer, Major Thomas Mitchell, who explored the south-eastern part of Australia, and whose return route for his third expedition passed through the present-day LGA.

It is one of the fastest growing regional municipalities in Victoria.

Council

Current composition
The council is composed of three wards and nine councillors, with three councillors per ward elected to represent each ward.

Administration and governance
The council meets in the council chambers at the council headquarters in the Broadford Civic Centre, which is also the location of the council's administrative activities. It also provides customer services at both its administrative centre in Broadford, and its service centres in Kilmore, Seymour and Wallan.

Townships and localities
In the 2021 census, the shire had a population of 49,460, up from 40,918 in the 2016 census

^ - Territory divided with another LGA

See also
 List of localities (Victoria)
 List of places on the Victorian Heritage Register in the Shire of Mitchell

References

External links
Mitchell Shire Council official website
Metlink local public transport map 
Link to Land Victoria interactive maps

Local government areas of Victoria (Australia)
Hume (region)
 
Hume Highway